Abu Ghraib Sport Club, is an Iraqi football team based in Abu Ghraib District, Baghdad, that plays in the Iraq Division Three.

Managerial history
 Qasim Jaber
 Shukor Ali

See also
 2016–17 Iraq FA Cup
 2020–21 Iraq FA Cup

References

External links
 Abu Ghraib SC on Goalzz.com
 Iraq Clubs- Foundation Dates

1990 establishments in Iraq
Association football clubs established in 1990
Football clubs in Baghdad